The ZK-383 is a submachine gun developed by the Koucký brothers, who worked at the pre-war Československá zbrojovka, akc.spol. (under its name of Zbrojovka Brno after World War II) arms factory in Brno, Czechoslovakia. It was produced at a slow rate from 1938 onwards and was exported as far away as Bolivia and Venezuela.

History

The ZK-383 was exported to many smaller European countries following its production start date in 1938. The production of the ZK-383 continued at Brno arms factory even during the German occupation during World War II. Most of the guns produced were supplied to the Waffen-SS. It continued to be produced in small numbers in the postwar period and production ended in 1948. The ZK-383 was slowly phased out by smaller and lighter submachine guns such as the Sa vz. 23. Bulgaria continued using it until the 1970s.

Design 

The ZK-383 was originally designed to be a squad automatic weapon much like the British Bren and Soviet DP27, despite it shooting a pistol round and not a full sized rifle cartridge. It became an individual submachine gun which resembles the German MP 18. For a submachine gun, the ZK-383 was a heavy and robustly made weapon. Military versions possessed detachable barrels, an integrated bipod, and rifle type sights, components considered unusual in submachineguns of the era. The police variant, designated the ZK-383-P, lacked these features, as did the postwar ZK-383-H.

Features 

The ZK-383 was fitted with a quickly detachable barrel. The lock/release mechanism was located beneath the front sight. It fires from an open bolt and by removing the bolt weight, the shooter could change the cyclic rate from 450 to 750 rpm. The magazine fed in from the left hand side like the British Sten. The manual safety was located in front of the trigger on the left side of the weapon. The ZK-383 had two firing modes, semi- and full-auto. Selection was made via the use of a short or long trigger pull. The stock was made from wood and had a folding bipod. The guns featured a hooded front sight and a rear adjustable tangent iron sight.

Variants

ZK-383; Standard production model
ZK-383-P; Police version, lacking a folding bipod and detachable barrel
ZK-383-H; Post-war production version which also lacked a bipod and detachable barrel; instead of a left side magazine, this model had a forward-facing underslung magazine

Users

See also

 Weapons of Czechoslovakia interwar period

Beretta Model 38
Light Machine Gun
PPD-40
Suomi KP/-31

References

External links 

ZK 383 on GunsTribune
Czech ZK-383 Transferable Submachine Gun

Submachine guns of Czechoslovakia
World War II submachine guns
9mm Parabellum submachine guns
Military equipment introduced in the 1930s